Víctor Bó (born 8 April 1943) is a Argentine actor and film producer. He is the son of classic actor and director Armando Bó, and father and uncle of Academy Award Winners for Best Original Screenplay Armando Bo and Nicolás Giacobone, respectively. Bo is retired from acting.

Biography 
Bó broke into acting aged 16 in 1959, in the film ... y el Demonio creó a los hombres, and costarred in several films directed by his father and starring Isabel Sarli. In 1971 he appeared in Así es Buenos Aires, and achieved greater fame as one of the protagonists in the Superagentes ("Super Agents") saga of spy-adventure films (1974–1983). He played villain roles for two movies in a series of nine sword and sorcery films that Roger Corman produced in Argentina during the 1980s, in association with Aries Cinematográfica Argentina: Deathstalker (1983) and the classic B-movie Barbarian Queen (1984).

Bó started to distance himself from acting after the release of the comic-based comedy film Las Puertitas del señor López (1988), and turned into film production. He helped produce two movies directed by Jorge Polaco: the controversial cult film Kindergarten (1989), which was deemed "obscene", "bordering on pornography" and censored by a judge's order at the time of its release, resulting in a 30-year ban for the film, which was officially released in 2010; and the black comedy Siempre es difícil volver a casa (1992), which was a critical and commercial failure at the time of its release, but has slowly gained some critical reappraisal over the years.

Except for a few roles on TV series or documentary interviews, and a supporting role in a new Superagentes film (Los superagentes, nueva generación, 2008), Bó has been mostly retired from the filmmaking world in any capacity, focusing instead in being interviewed and appearing in film retrospectives and showings dedicated to his father Armando's body of work.

Filmography

Actor 
Y el demonio creó a los hombres (1959)
Pelota de cuero (1963)
La Tentación desnuda (1966) (as Víctor Bó) as Cholo
La señora del intendente (1967) as Rosendo Fernández
La Mujer de mi padre (1968) as Mario
Carne (1968) as Antonio
Embrujada (1969) as Juan
Desnuda en la arena (1969)
Los Mochileros (1970)
Los Neuróticos (1971)
Así es Buenos Aires (1971)
Yo gané el prode, ¿y usted? (1973)
Hipólito y Evita (1973)
Furia infernal (1973) as Land owner's older son
La Gran aventura (1974) as Hércules
La Super, super aventura (1975)
La Aventura explosiva (1977)
Los Superagentes biónicos (1977)
Una Mariposa en la noche (1977)
Los Superagentes y el tesoro maldito (1978)
Los Superagentes no se rompen (1979)
Hormiga negra (1979)
La Aventura de los paraguas asesinos (1979)
El Último amor en Tierra del Fuego (1979)
Los Superagentes contra todos (1980)
Los Superagentes y la gran aventura del oro (1980)
Superagentes y titanes (1983) as Delfín
Deathstalker (1983) as Kang
Barbarian Queen (1985) as Strymon
Los Superagentes contra los fantasmas (1986)
Las Puertitas del señor López (1988)
Los superagentes, nueva generación (2008)

Television appearances 
El Sodero de mi vida (aka The Bubbleman of My Life; 2001) as Verónica's husband

External links 

 

1943 births
Living people
Argentine male film actors
Argentine film producers
Male actors from Buenos Aires